Tomnatecu River may refer to the following rivers in Romania:
 Tomnatecu, a tributary of the Bârnar in Suceava County 
 Tomnatec, a tributary of the Neagra Broștenilor in Harghita County
 Tomnatecu, a tributary of the Râul Mare in Alba County